Rissopsis is a genus of very small, somewhat amphibious land snails that have a gill and an operculum, semi-terrestrial gastropod mollusks or micromollusk  in the family Iravadiidae.

Species
Species within the genus Rissopsis include:
 Rissopsis prolongata (Turton, 1932)
 Rissopsis tuba Kilburn, 1977
 Rissopsis typica Garrett, 1873
Species brought into synonymy
 Rissopsis brevis May, 1919: synonym of Austrorissopsis consobrina (Tate & May, 1900)
 Rissopsis expansa Powell, 1930: synonym of Eusetia expansa (Powell, 1930)
 Rissopsis ligula Kilburn, 1975: synonym of Rissopsis prolongata (Turton, 1932)

References

  Ponder W. F. (1984) A review of the genera of the Iravadiidae (Gastropoda: Rissoacea) with an assessment of the relationships of the family. Malacologia 25(1): 21-71. page(s): 51-52

Iravadiidae